Rally Hungary is a rally event that takes place in Nyíregyháza, Zemplén Mountains and Máriapócs in Hungary. The rally was organized for the first time in 2018 under the name of Nyíregyháza Rally, it consisted of 17 stages and 223 km of route, the first and only edition of this rally was won by the local András Hadik. 

In 2019, already like the Rally Hungary, the event was selected as a round of the European Rally Championship, replacing the Acropolis Rally. It was the first Hungarian rally to be part of the European Championship since 2003 (Fehérvár Rally). Another local Frigyes Turán won the first Rally Hungary.

Winners

References

Hungary
Auto races in Hungary
Nyíregyháza